Ellen Meriam Go Adarna-Ramsay (born April 2, 1988) is a Filipino actress, model, and former internet celebrity. Her family owns various hotels, condominiums and Queensland, a chain of motels in Cebu, Manila and Davao. They also own a temple in honor of her late grandmother. A Gravure model, Adarna has appeared in various magazine covers in the Philippines, such as Candy, FHM, Esquire, UNO, Preview, Speed and Women's Health.

Early life
Adarna is the eldest of five siblings. She completed her primary and secondary education at the premier, all-girls' Catholic school Saint Theresa's College of Cebu. Adarna took up Business Administration, but dropped out in her sophomore year. As a teenager, she graced the covers of Candy magazine for 2005 and 2006. Adarna briefly worked as a secretary at her dad's company before leaving Cebu for Manila, to pursue a career in the limelight.

Career

Career beginnings and GMA Network: 2010–2013
Adarna made her acting debut through the Philippine television's longest-running gag show, Bubble Gang, where she appeared as a regular until 2013. The series was well received from the public and garnered several awards, including Best Gag Television series. Meanwhile, in the film industry, she made her first appearance by starring in Si Agimat at si Enteng Kabisote (2010), playing only a minor role. Her career then went into expansion after she became part of the cast of Captain Barbell (2011) opposite Richard Gutierrez and Jillian Ward. Shortly after Captain Barbell, Adarna became part of Survivor Philippines: Celebrity Doubles Showdown (2011). She starred as herself and one of the Castaways of the series. She also made a cameo in the teen-oriented comedy drama film, Tween Academy: Class of 2012 (2011). The film was produced by GMA Films, and Adarna starred alongside Barbie Forteza, Bea Binene, Jake Vargas, and the likes.

She became part of the fantasy television series Alice Bungisngis and her Wonder Walis, in 2012, reuniting with her Tween Academy: Class of 2012 co-stars Derrick Monasterio and Lexi Fernandez. Adarna once again played a minor role in the film Boy Pick-Up: The Movie (2012), as one of the bombshells. After Alice Bungisngis and her Wonder Walis, she played a celestial clairvoyant in the primetime historical-cultural epic drama television series Indio (2013), playing a supporting character named Dalikmata. After portraying several supporting and minor roles in movies, Adarna played the title role in the indie film, Ang Tag-Araw ni Twinkle. She continued to take on a supporting role in the horror-themed movie Basement (2014), a film starring Betong Sumaya.

Transfer to ABS-CBN: 2013–14
After being a GMA contract artist for 3 years, Adarna officially became a Kapamilya star after signing a contract with Star Magic in 2013. For her first ABS-CBN appearance, she became a contestant of the singing competition game show The Singing Bee (2014) and started as a performer on ASAP (2014–present). Being a new transferee, Adarna guested on several interview series including The Buzz (2014). She later on guested on Vice Ganda's talk show Gandang Gabi, Vice! (2014).

Adarna got her first Kapamilya teleserye while starring in the science fiction romance television series Moon of Desire (2014). Adarna played the role of Tamara Herrera, the main antagonist. The series premiered on ABS-CBN's Kapamilya Gold afternoon block on March 31, 2014, and concluded on August 15, 2014, with a total of 97 episodes. In the series, Adarna starred alongside Meg Imperial, JC de Vera, and Dominic Roque. After Moon of Desire, Adarna made her leading role in the comedy romantic movie My Illegal Wife. The film was produced by Star Cinema. Adarna then starred in Beauty in a Bottle (2014) with Angelica Panganiban and Angeline Quinto.

2015–present: Breakthrough with Pasión de Amor and hiatus 
In June 2015, she became part of the critically acclaimed primetime drama Pasión de Amor, a Philippine remake and adaptation of the 2003 Columbian erotic drama Pasión de Gavilanes. She starred opposite leading men, Jake Cuenca, Ejay Falcon, and Joseph Marco. Adarna was paired up with Ejay Falcon and the two made headlines as Sari (Adarna) and Oscar (Falcon). The series ended in February 2016. While doing Pasión de Amor, Adarna was part of You're Still the One, playing the role of Racquel, the woman who Jojo (Dennis Trillo) is engaged to.

Adarna reunited with Ejay Falcon for a second series together, while starring in The Greatest Love (2016). She played the role of young Gloria who appears in flashbacks when adult Gloria (Sylvia Sanchez) remembers her past with Peter (Ejay Falcon), because of the effects of her Alzheimer's disease. Adarna then became part of Langit Lupa, playing the role of Isa Sobrevista, the main antagonist. She is currently on hiatus since 2018.

Filmography

FHM rankings

Personal life 
Ellen Adarna married Derek Ramsay on November 11, 2021.
She has a son with John Lloyd Cruz

References

External links
 
 

Star Magic personalities
1988 births
21st-century Filipino actresses
People from Cebu City
Actresses from Cebu
Filipino Internet celebrities
Living people
Participants in Philippine reality television series
Survivor Philippines contestants
GMA Network personalities
ABS-CBN personalities